Trpišovice is a municipality and village in Havlíčkův Brod District in the Vysočina Region of the Czech Republic. It has about 200 inhabitants.

Administrative parts
Villages and hamlets of Bilantova Lhota, Dobrovítova Lhota, Koňkovice, Remuta and Smrčná are administrative parts of Trpišovice.

References

Villages in Havlíčkův Brod District